is a Japanese animated series by Nippon Animation. It is based on the 1963 autobiographical novel Rascal, A Memoir of a Better Era by Sterling North.

In the past, Rascal, the popular fictional raccoon character in a kid's anime, manifested itself as a pet throughout Japan households, leading to the destruction of countless national heritages. In recent years, however, Rascal's popularity has been in steady decline, but some renewed interest has been found in the form of digital stickers and merchandise.

Japanese cast
 Masako Nozawa as Rascal
 Toshihiko Utsumi as Sterling North
 Yoshiko Matsuo as Theodora "Theo" North
 Michiru Haga as Jessica North
 Masato Yamanouchi as Willard North
 Kuniko Kashii as Elisabeth North
 Yūji Shikamata as Oscar Sunderland
 Akio Nojima as Carl
 Eken Mine as Federiko
 Hisako Kyouda as Clarissa
 Ichirô Nagai as Thurman
 Kazuko Sugiyama as Sensei
 Masahiko Murase as Conway
 Masako Nozawa as Greta Sunderland
 Masaya Taki as Slammy
 Miina Tominaga as Alice
 Mikio Terashima as Doctor Michel
 Miyoko Asou as Hacket
 Takako Sasuga as Martha
 Takeshi Kuwabara as Arthur
 Tohru Furuya as Tom
 Toshiya Ueda as Futon

Plot 
The anime revolves around a young boy who decided to provide shelter to a raccoon that was discovered by a hunter. As the boy attempted to domesticate the wild animal as part of his family, he soon realized through trials and tribulations that his efforts were futile and decided to release Rascal back into the wild.

Music
The series uses two pieces of theme music for the opening theme and the ending theme. The opening theme was later used as the main gameplay theme for the 1981 arcade game Frogger. The show's music was composed by Takeo Watanabe, who worked on many anime of the 1970s and 80s.

Impact 

Raccoons are an invasive species in Japan and there is evidence that Rascal the Raccoon has contributed enormously to the problem of invasive raccoons in Japan. Like other invasive species, raccoons in Japan have few natural predators.

Although the anime Rascal the Raccoon's storyline revolves around the difficulties of taking in a raccoon as a pet, Japanese citizens became inspired to import raccoons in to the country as their pet, leading to unforeseen consequences.  In Japan, up to 1,500 raccoons were imported as pets each year after the success of Rascal the Raccoon. In 2004, the descendants of discarded or escaped animals lived in 42 of 47 prefectures and then to all 47 prefectures by 2008. These raccoons are now a pest in Japan and imports of raccoons are now banned.

The importation of raccoons was banned because people in Japan started releasing their pet raccoons in to the wild—especially after the final episode of Rascal the Raccoon was released. Additionally, raccoons can become too violent and hard to handle once they grew up, which further encouraged people to release them.

This negatively affected Japan's natural ecosystem and man-made infrastructures and it was estimated that about 80% of the temples in Japan were damaged by raccoons including Byōdō-in in Kyoto which has more than 900 years of history. Raccoons attributed to Rascal also caused the destruction of crops in the agricultural sector and Japan suffers an estimated of 30,000,000 yen annually from the effects in the agricultural sector alone.

Even with backlash from animal advocates, the Japanese government decided to adopt the 0% tolerance policy where the goal is to kill as many raccoons as possible. This includes killing thousands of raccoons each year. The government also placed a lot of tight sanctions to minimize the chances of being able to import any more raccoons into the country. In 2003, the Hokkaido government specifically implemented the 10-year plan to completely eradicate raccoons in Japan. However, attempts proved to be mostly futile as there was not enough financial support.

Rascal appearances 
Rascal appeared in commercials, games and anime.
 The Adventures of Peter Pan (1989) 
 Pokapoka Mori no Rascal (2006, aired in Kids Station as the studio's first anime series for preschoolers.)
 Araiguma Rascal Special in Monster Strike game (game and CM)
 Meitantei Rascal (2014, aired in NHK Educational TV)
Line, a South Korean Communication Application

Video games 
 Araiguma Rascal: Raccoon Rascal, puzzle game developed by J-Force and published by Masaya on 25 March 1994 for the Super Famicom.
 Oide Rascal,  action game developed by Agatsuma Entertainment and published by Tam on 25 April 2001 for the Game Boy Color.

References

External links 
Official website

 Rascal book and anime history site

1977 anime television series debuts
Children's manga
Drama anime and manga
Historical anime and manga
Fuji TV original programming
World Masterpiece Theater series
Television series about raccoons
Television shows based on American novels
Television shows set in Wisconsin
Television series set in the 1910s
Adventure anime and manga